Seaton Park Nature Reserve is conservation area in the suburb of Durban North, Durban, South Africa.  The reserve is a six hectare remnant of coastal forest, with trails throughout. The park is named after a Mrs Seaton, who bequeathed the land for the park.

Flora and fauna
The park is on the lower eastern slope of a steep valley protected from coastal wind. The park consists mostly of coastal lowland forest. Natal loquat, forest ironplum and real yellowwood trees are found in the reserve.

References 

Nature reserves in South Africa